Kaylartha Pagoda is a Buddhist Pagoda that sits atop the summit of Mount Kaylartha in Mon State, Myanmar.  Local legend claims that at the foot of Kaylartha Mountain sat the ancient Kingdom of the Gold.

Geography

The range is part of the or Eastern Arakan Yoma Mountains. The summit is above . Monkeys live atop the mountain and are fed by pilgrims.

The Pagoda and surrounding monasteries are located within the Kelatha Wildlife Sanctuary.

History

At the top of Mount Kaylartha stands a pagoda said to house a hair of Gautama Buddha. It is believed that in the Tharthanar Era (111), the Lord Buddha arrived at the Kaylartha Mountain, Thuwunna Bonmi.  He stayed at a monastery built by King Tissa Dama Thiha Yaza.  The Lord Buddha preached sermons to the public for seven days. During that time, he became close with the Hermits Tissa and Thiha and the local hermit of Kaylartha Mountain. They requested that he leave behind some relic to be revered by the people in his place after he left to return home. Lord Buddha agreed and gave six of his hairs to hermits from Kyaiktiyo, Zinkyaik (to Tissa), Mount Zwegabin (to Thiha), Kaylartha, Kuthaerayone and Melan. A pair of belu brothers from Kyaikhtisaung also received a hair.  All the hermits and belus enshrined the hair in great stones.

The Hermit of Kaylartha, whose name was Tila of Dokkhalun, discussed how to go about enshrining the hairs and building pagodas around them with Hermits Tissa and Thiha and Indra Sakka, who had supported Thiha in constructing a pagoda on Mount Zwegabin.  He enshrined the hair relic in the pagoda atop Kaylartha Mountain, and was advised by Indra Sakka. 

The hermits communicated with each other by shining lights atop their respective mountains at night-time.  Tissa, who stayed atop Zinkyaik Mountain, did not see light coming from Mountain Kaylartha and wondered what might have occurred.  He went to Kaylartha Mountain and found the body of the Kaylartha Hermit.  The body was burnt and buried, while the head, which was not burnt nor decomposed, held one of Buddha's hairs in its braid. It was returned to Mok Soe Taung Pagoda and joined the original two hair relics there.

Restoration

The Kyaikhtisaung Sayadaw restored nine Buddha hair relic pagodas during his lifetime, with Kaylartha Pagoda being one of them. He built a compound around the pagoda and paved a road up to the top. It is now a popular spot for tourists and locals and had a resident abbot and monastery at the summit of the mountain.

Mining

In 2016, a rock and quarry project aimed at producing rock suitable for road paving was suspended on Kaylatha Mountain. On October 19, the Hluttaw state representative of Belin Township Constituency No. 1, Dr. Khin Naing Oo, sent a letter of opposition regarding the preparation for a mining project on the forest reserve to the President and various other respective government departments.  The project was headed by Rock Well Mining Co., Ltd..  Ohn Win, the Ministry of Natural Resources and Environmental Conservation, visited the area nine days later on October 28.  He witnessed the field work taking place and decided to suspend the work.  A temporary ban was placed from mining on the historic site.  Eventually, quarry projects were permitted to operate only along the boundaries of the Kaylartha Wildlife Sanctuary (450 acres of land) as they had historically been quarry sites.

References

Bibliography

Buddhist relics
Buddhist pilgrimage sites in Myanmar
Pagodas in Myanmar